Grand Mosque of Sivas is a historic mosque located in the Central district of Sivas, Turkey. It is considered that the building was constructed during the reign of Anatolian beylik Danishmendids (1071–1178 ).

References

Mosques in Turkey
Buildings and structures in Sivas
Anatolian Beyliks architecture
Tourist attractions in Sivas
12th-century mosques
Sivas